Alf Sigfrid Emanuel Roos (20 January 1910 – 8 August 1988) was a Swedish footballer who played for Västerås. He featured twice for the Sweden national football team in 1928 and 1931, scoring two goals.

Career statistics

International

International goals
Scores and results list Sweden's goal tally first.

References

20th-century births
1997 deaths
Sportspeople from Västerås
Swedish footballers
Sweden international footballers
Association football forwards
IFK Västerås players